Deshabandu Sirisumana Godage (born in May 1936) is a Sri Lankan entrepreneur. He is Sri Lanka’s leading book publisher. Presently he is the chairman of the Godage International Publishers. 

Living people
1936 births
Sinhalese businesspeople
Sri Lankan Buddhists
Deshabandu